Earl of Ruglen was a title in the Peerage of Scotland. Along with the subsidiary titles Viscount of Riccartoun and Lord Hillhouse, it was created on the 14th of April, 1697, for Lord John Douglas-Hamilton, fourth (third surviving) son of William Douglas-Hamilton, Duke of Hamilton, 1st Earl of Selkirk, and his wife Anne Hamilton, 3rd Duchess of Hamilton. The 1st Earl of Ruglen succeeded as 3rd Earl of Selkirk on the death of his elder brother in 1739. The Earl's only son William, Lord Daer, died in 1742, so on the death of the Earl of Selkirk and Ruglen in 1744, the Earldom of Selkirk passed to his great-nephew, while the Earldom of Ruglen passed to his daughter, Anne, who had married William Douglas, 2nd Earl of March. On her death in 1748, the Earldom of Ruglen passed to her only child William, 3rd Earl of March. He succeeded his first cousin once removed Charles Douglas as 5th Marquess and 4th Duke of Queensberry in 1778.

The 3rd Earl died in 1810, and the Earldom of Ruglen became extinct, while other titles passed to late Earl’s relatives. His second cousin twice removed (Francis Douglas, 8th Earl of Wemyss) succeeded to the Earldom of March, his fourth (and also third) cousin once removed (Sir Charles Douglas, 5th Bt) succeeded to the Marquessate of Queensberry, and his second cousin once removed (Henry Scott, 3rd Duke of Buccleuch) succeeded to the Dukedom of Queensberry.

Earls of Ruglen (1697) 

John Douglas-Hamilton, 1st Earl of Ruglen, 3rd Earl of Selkirk (1664–1744)
Anne Hamilton, 2nd Countess of Ruglen (1698–1748)
William Douglas, 3rd Earl of March, 3rd Earl of Ruglen, 5th Marquess of Queensberry, 4th Duke of Queensberry (1725–1810)

Extinct earldoms in the Peerage of Scotland
Noble titles created in 1697